Charles James Sprague (January 16, 1823, Boston – August 5, 1903, Hingham, Massachusetts) was a bank official, author, poet, musician, and botanist, specializing in lichenology.

Charles James Sprague, whose father was the poet Charles Sprague (1791–1875), followed his father into the banking business. For many years Charles J. Sprague contributed poems and articles to periodicals. In the 1850s and 1860s he was a curator in botany for the Boston Society of Natural History.

From 1874 to 1880 Cyrus G. Pringle collected lichens for Sprague's herbarium.

In 1856 Charles J. Sprague was elected a fellow of the American Academy of Arts and Sciences. His herbarium is now at Boston's Museum of Science.

References

External links
 
 

1823 births
1903 deaths
19th-century American botanists
American lichenologists
Fellows of the American Academy of Arts and Sciences